Ju Posht may refer to:
 Ju Posht, Astaneh-ye Ashrafiyeh
 Ju Posht, Rasht

See also
 Posht Ju